Isotope geochemistry is an aspect of geology based upon the study of natural variations in the relative abundances of isotopes of various elements. Variations in isotopic abundance are measured by isotope ratio mass spectrometry, and can reveal information about the ages and origins of rock, air or water bodies, or processes of mixing between them.

Stable isotope geochemistry is largely concerned with isotopic variations arising from mass-dependent isotope fractionation, whereas radiogenic isotope geochemistry is concerned with the products of natural radioactivity.

Stable isotope geochemistry
For most stable isotopes, the magnitude of fractionation from  kinetic and equilibrium fractionation is very small; for this reason, enrichments are typically reported in "per mil" (‰, parts per thousand).  These enrichments (δ) represent the ratio of heavy isotope to light isotope in the sample over the ratio of a standard.  That is,
 ‰

Hydrogen

Carbon

Carbon has two stable isotopes, 12C and 13C, and one radioactive isotope, 14C.

The stable carbon isotope ratio, δ13C, is measured against Vienna Pee Dee Belemnite (VPDB). The stable carbon isotopes are fractionated primarily by photosynthesis (Faure, 2004).  The 13C/12C ratio is also an indicator of paleoclimate: a change in the ratio in the remains of plants indicates a change in the amount of photosynthetic activity, and thus in how favorable the environment was for the plants. During photosynthesis, organisms using the  C3 pathway show different enrichments compared to those using the  C4 pathway, allowing scientists not only to distinguish organic matter from abiotic carbon, but also what type of photosynthetic pathway the organic matter was using.  Occasional spikes in the global 13C/12C ratio have also been useful as stratigraphic markers for chemostratigraphy, especially during the Paleozoic.

The 14C ratio has been used to track ocean circulation, among other things.

Nitrogen
Nitrogen has two stable isotopes, 14N and 15N.  The ratio between these is measured relative to nitrogen in ambient air.  Nitrogen ratios are frequently linked to agricultural activities.  Nitrogen isotope data has also been used to measure the amount of exchange of air between the stratosphere and troposphere using data from the greenhouse gas  N2O.

Oxygen
Oxygen has three stable isotopes, 16O, 17O, and 18O.  Oxygen ratios are measured relative to Vienna Standard Mean Ocean Water (VSMOW) or Vienna Pee Dee Belemnite (VPDB).  Variations in oxygen isotope ratios are used to track both water movement, paleoclimate, and atmospheric gases such as ozone and carbon dioxide.  Typically, the VPDB oxygen reference is used for paleoclimate, while VSMOW is used for most other applications.  Oxygen isotopes appear in anomalous ratios in atmospheric ozone, resulting from mass-independent fractionation.  Isotope ratios in fossilized foraminifera have been used to deduce the temperature of ancient seas.

Sulfur
Sulfur has four stable isotopes, with the following abundances: 32S (0.9502), 33S (0.0075), 34S (0.0421) and 36S (0.0002). These abundances are compared to those found in  Cañon Diablo troilite. Variations in sulfur isotope ratios are used to study the origin of sulfur in an orebody and the temperature of formation of sulfur–bearing minerals as well as a biosignature that can reveal presence of sulfate reducing microbes.

Radiogenic isotope geochemistry

Radiogenic isotopes provide powerful tracers for studying the ages and origins of Earth systems. They are particularly useful to understand mixing processes between different components, because (heavy) radiogenic isotope ratios are not usually fractionated by chemical processes.

Radiogenic isotope tracers are most powerful when used together with other tracers: The more tracers used, the more control on mixing processes. An example of this application is to the evolution of the Earth's crust and Earth's mantle through geological time.

Lead–lead isotope geochemistry

Lead has four stable isotopes: 204Pb, 206Pb, 207Pb, and 208Pb.

Lead is created in the Earth via decay of actinide elements, primarily uranium and thorium.

Lead isotope geochemistry is useful for providing isotopic dates on a variety of materials. Because the lead isotopes are created by decay of different transuranic elements, the ratios of the four lead isotopes to one another can be very useful in tracking the source of melts in igneous rocks, the source of sediments and even the origin of people via isotopic fingerprinting of their teeth, skin and bones.

It has been used to date ice cores from the Arctic shelf, and provides information on the source of atmospheric lead pollution.

Lead–lead isotopes has been successfully used in forensic science to fingerprint bullets, because each batch of ammunition has its own peculiar 204Pb/206Pb vs 207Pb/208Pb ratio.

Samarium–neodymium

Samarium–neodymium is an isotope system which can be utilised to provide a date as well as isotopic fingerprints of geological materials, and various other materials including archaeological finds (pots, ceramics).

147Sm decays to produce 143Nd with a half life of 1.06x1011 years.

Dating is achieved usually by trying to produce an isochron of several minerals within a rock specimen. The initial 143Nd/144Nd ratio is determined.

This initial ratio is modelled relative to CHUR (the Chondritic Uniform Reservoir), which is an approximation of the chondritic material which formed the solar system. CHUR was determined by analysing chondrite and achondrite meteorites.

The difference in the ratio of the sample relative to CHUR can give information on a model age of extraction from the mantle (for which an assumed evolution has been calculated relative to CHUR) and to whether this was extracted from a granitic source (depleted in radiogenic Nd), the mantle, or an enriched source.

Rhenium–osmium

Rhenium and osmium are siderophile elements which are present at very low abundances in the crust. Rhenium undergoes radioactive decay to produce osmium. The ratio of non-radiogenic osmium to radiogenic osmium throughout time varies.

Rhenium prefers to enter sulfides more readily than osmium. Hence, during melting of the mantle, rhenium is stripped out, and prevents the osmium–osmium ratio from changing appreciably. This locks in an initial osmium ratio of the sample at the time of the melting event. Osmium–osmium initial ratios are used to determine the source characteristic and age of mantle melting events.

Noble gas isotopes
Natural isotopic variations amongst the noble gases result from both radiogenic and nucleogenic production processes. Because of their unique properties, it is useful to distinguish them from the conventional radiogenic isotope systems described above.

Helium-3
Helium-3 was trapped in the planet when it formed.  Some 3He is being added by meteoric dust, primarily collecting on the bottom of oceans (although due to subduction, all oceanic tectonic plates are younger than continental plates). However, 3He will be degassed from oceanic sediment during subduction, so cosmogenic 3He is not affecting the concentration or noble gas ratios of the mantle.

Helium-3 is created by cosmic ray bombardment, and by lithium spallation reactions which generally occur in the crust. Lithium spallation is the process by which a high-energy neutron bombards a lithium atom, creating a 3He  and a 4He ion. This requires significant lithium to adversely affect the 3He/4He ratio.

All degassed helium is lost to space eventually, due to the average speed of helium exceeding the escape velocity for the Earth. Thus, it is assumed the helium content and ratios of Earth's atmosphere have remained essentially stable.

It has been observed that 3He is present in volcano emissions and oceanic ridge samples.  How 3He is stored in the planet is under investigation, but it is associated with the mantle and is used as a marker of material of deep origin.

Due to similarities in helium and carbon in magma chemistry, outgassing of helium requires the loss of volatile components (water, carbon dioxide) from the mantle, which happens at depths of less than 60 km. However, 3He is transported to the surface primarily trapped in the crystal lattice of minerals within fluid inclusions.

Helium-4 is created by radiogenic production (by decay of uranium/thorium-series elements).  The continental crust has become enriched with those elements relative to the mantle and thus more He4 is produced in the crust than in the mantle.

The ratio (R) of 3He to 4He  is often used to represent 3He  content.  R usually is given as a multiple of the present atmospheric ratio (Ra).

Common values for R/Ra:
 Old continental crust: less than 1
 mid-ocean ridge basalt (MORB): 7 to 9
 Spreading ridge rocks: 9.1 plus or minus 3.6
 Hotspot rocks: 5 to 42
 Ocean and terrestrial water: 1
 Sedimentary formation water: less than 1
 Thermal spring water: 3 to 11

3He/4He isotope chemistry is being used to date groundwaters, estimate groundwater flow rates, track water pollution, and provide insights into hydrothermal processes, igneous geology and ore genesis. 
 (U-Th)/He dating of apatite as a thermal history tool
 USGS: Helium Discharge at Mammoth Mountain Fumarole (MMF)

Isotopes in actinide decay chains

Isotopes in the decay chains of actinides are unique amongst radiogenic isotopes because they are both radiogenic and radioactive. Because their abundances are normally quoted as activity ratios rather than atomic ratios, they are best considered separately from the other radiogenic isotope systems.

Protactinium/Thorium – 231Pa / 230Th

Uranium is well mixed in the ocean, and its decay produces 231Pa and 230Th at a constant activity ratio (0.093). The decay products are rapidly removed by adsorption on settling particles, but not at equal rates. 231Pa has a residence equivalent to the residence time of deep water in the Atlantic basin (around 1000 yrs) but 230Th is removed more rapidly (centuries). Thermohaline circulation effectively exports 231Pa from the Atlantic into the Southern Ocean, while most of the 230Th remains in Atlantic sediments. As a result, there is a relationship between 231Pa/230Th in Atlantic sediments and the rate of overturning: faster overturning produces lower sediment 231Pa/230Th ratio, while slower overturning increases this ratio. The combination of δ13C and 231Pa/230Th can therefore provide a more complete insight into past circulation changes.

Anthropogenic isotopes

Tritium/helium-3
Tritium was released to the atmosphere during atmospheric testing of nuclear bombs. Radioactive decay of tritium produces the noble gas helium-3.  Comparing the ratio of tritium to helium-3 (3H/3He) allows estimation of the age of recent ground waters. A small amount of Tritium is also produced naturally by cosmic ray spallation and spontaneous ternary fission in natural uranium and thorium, but due to the relatively short half-life of Tritium and the relatively small quantities (compared to those from humandmade sources) those sources of Tritium usually play only a secondary role in the analysis of groundwater.
 USGS Tritium/Helium-3 Dating
 Hydrologic Isotope Tracers - Helium

See also
 Cosmogenic isotopes
 Environmental isotopes
 Geochemistry
 Isotopic signature
 Radiometric dating
 Isotope-ratio mass spectrometry
 Sulfur isotope biogeochemistry
 Urey-Bigeleisen-Mayer equation

Notes

References

General

Allègre C.J., 2008.  Isotope Geology (Cambridge University Press).
Dickin A.P., 2005.  Radiogenic Isotope Geology (Cambridge University Press).
Faure G., Mensing T.M. (2004), Isotopes: Principles and Applications (John Wiley & Sons).
Hoefs J., 2004. Stable Isotope Geochemistry (Springer Verlag).
Sharp Z., 2006. Principles of Stable Isotope Geochemistry (Prentice Hall).

Stable isotopes
 Environmental Isotopes  (University of Ottawa)
 Fundamentals of Isotope Geochemistry  (C. Kendall & E.A. Caldwell, chap.2 in Isotope Tracers in Catchment Hydrology [edited by C. Kendall & J.J. McDonnell], 1998)
 Stable Isotopes and Mineral Resource Investigations in the United States  (USGS)

3He/4He

Re–Os

External links
National Isotope Development Center Reference information on isotopes, and coordination and management of isotope production, availability, and distribution
Isotope Development & Production for Research and Applications (IDPRA) U.S. Department of Energy program for isotope production and production research and development

Geochemistry
Geophysics
Geochronological dating methods